Heosphora grammivena is a moth in the family Pyralidae. The species was first described by George Hampson in 1918. It is found in Australia.

References 

Pyralidae
Moths of Australia
Moths described in 1918
Taxa named by George Hampson